Omonville may refer to several communes in Normandy, France :
 Omonville, a commune of Seine-Maritime, 
 Omonville-la-Petite, a commune in Manche
 Omonville-la-Rogue, a commune in Manche
 Le Tremblay-Omonville, a commune in Eure
 Omonville-la-Foliot, ou la-Folliot, a former commune in Manche, now part of Denneville

See also 
Saint-Martin-Osmonville